Events in the year 1984 in the Republic of India.

Incumbents
 President of India – Zail Singh
 Prime Minister of India – Indira Gandhi until 31 October, Rajiv Gandhi
 Chief Justice of India – Yeshwant Vishnu Chandrachud

Governors
 Andhra Pradesh – Thakur Ram Lal (until 29 August), Shankar Dayal Sharma (starting 29 August)
 Assam – 
 until 28 March: Prakash Mehrotra
 28 March-15 April: Tribeni Sahai Misra
 starting 15 April: Bhishma Narain Singh
 Bihar – Akhlaqur Rahman Kidwai 
 Gujarat – K.M. Chandy (until 26 April), Braj Kumar Nehru (starting 26 April)
 Haryana – Ganpatrao Devji Tapase (until 13 June), Saiyid Muzaffar Husain Burney (starting 13 June) 
 Himachal Pradesh – Hokishe Sema 
 Jammu and Kashmir – B. K. Nehru (until 26 April), Jagmohan Malhotra (starting 26 April)
 Karnataka – Ashoknath Banerji 
 Kerala – P. Ramachandran 
 Madhya Pradesh – B. D. Sharma (starting 14 May), K.M Chandy (starting 14 May)
 Maharashtra – Idris Hasan Latif 
 Manipur – S. M. H. Burney (until 11 June), K. V. Krishna Rao (starting 11 June) 
 Meghalaya – 
 until 29 March: Prakash Mehrotra
 29 March-15 April: Tribeni Sahai Misra 
 starting 15 April: Bhishma Narain Singh 
 Nagaland – S. M. H. Burney (until 11 June), K. V. Krishna Rao (starting 11 June)  
 Odisha – Bishambhar Nath Pande 
 Punjab – Bhairab Dutt Pande (until 3 July), Kershasp Tehmurasp Satarawala (starting 3 July)
 Rajasthan – Om Prakash Mehra 
 Sikkim – Homi J. H. Taleyarkhan (until 17 June), Kona Prabhakar Rao (starting 17 June)
 Tamil Nadu – Sundar Lal Khurana 
 Tripura – S. M. H. Burney (until 11 June), K. V. Krishna Rao (starting 11 June) 
 Uttar Pradesh – Chandeshwar Prasad Narayan Singh 
 West Bengal – 
 until 16 August: Anant Prasad Sharma 
 16 August-1 October: Satish Chandra
 starting 1 October: Uma Shankar Dikshit

Events

 National income - 2,521,882 million
 5 March – Prime Minister of India Indira Gandhi orders Operation Blue Star.
 2 April – Squadron Leader Rakesh Sharma is launched into space, aboard the Soyuz T-11.
 13 April – India launches Operation Meghdoot, as most of the Siachen Glacier in Kashmir comes under Indian control.
 1 June – The Indian government begins Operation Blue Star.
 4 June – Indian troops storm the Golden Temple at Amritsar, the Sikhs' holiest shrine.
 31 October – Indian Prime Minister Indira Gandhi is assassinated by her two Sikh security guards. Her son Rajiv Gandhi succeeds her as Prime Minister.
 31 October – 3 November An estimated 2,700-10,000 Sikhs killed during the anti-Sikh riots in Delhi and other areas; mobs loot and damage several Sikh homes, businesses and Gurdwaras in response to the assassination of Indira Gandhi.
 31 October – Birth Anniversary of Sardar Vallabhbhai Patel – The Iron Man of India. He was the one man who got 550 states and territories to form the united Republic of India.
 3 December – Bhopal disaster: A methyl isocyanate leak from a Union Carbide pesticide plant in Bhopal, Madhya Pradesh, kills more than 2,000 people outright and injures anywhere from 15,000 to 22,000 others (some 6,000 of whom later die from their injuries) in one of the worst industrial disasters in history.
 24 May - Kasargod district formed in Kerala.
 Thakazhi Sivasankara Pillai got Jnanpith Award.
 Government issued postal stamp of freedom fighter Mangal Pande.
 Silent valley declared as National Park by Prime Minister Indira Gandhi.
 The first 3-D film in India My dear kuttichathan was released.
 PT Usha enters Olympics final in Los Angeles.
 Shiny Abraham enters Olympics semi final in Los Angeles.
 Bachendri Pal – The first women Everest climber of India reached the summit of Everest.
 India's first metro- Kolkata metro started.
 Rajiv Gandhi become India's new prime Minister.
 Operation woodrose by Indian Army.
 Violence against sikh in Delhi.
 BSP National level party founded by Kashiram.

Law

Arts and literature
Indian National Trust for Art and Cultural Heritage, autonomous non-governmental organisation seeking to preserve Indian culture and heritage, is founded.

Births
4 January – Jeeva, actor.
6 January - Diljit Dosanjh, Indian Punjabi Singer.
12 March  Shreya Ghoshal, playback singer.
24 March – Adrian D'Souza, field hockey player.
1 April - Murali Vijay, cricketer.
2 April -  Deep Sidhu, actor and activist (d. 2022).
30 May - Rohini Sindhuri, Indian Administrative Service officer.
27 August - Y. S. Avinash Reddy, politician and member of parliament from Kadapa.
6 September – Diwakar Prasad, boxer.
19 September – Kavya Madhavan, actress.
23 September – Armstrong Pame, Indian Administrative Service officer.
27 October – Irfan Pathan, cricketer.
18 November – Nayantara, actress.

Deaths
10 March – I. S. Johar, actor, writer, producer and director (born 1920)
21 June – Arun Sarnaik, Renowned Marathi film actor, singer (born 1935)
6 June - Jarnail Singh Bhindranwale, militant, killed in Operation Blue Star (born 1947)
31 October – Indira Gandhi, Prime Minister, assassinated (born 1917)
5 November – Rehman, actor (born 1921)
25 November - Yashwantrao Chavan, chief minister of Maharashtra (born 1913)
31 December - K. R. Ramanathan, physicist and meteorologist (born 1893)

Full date unknown
Gopi Krishna, yogi, mystic, teacher, social reformer and writer (born 1903).

See also 
 Bollywood films of 1984

References

 
1980s in India
India
Years of the 20th century in India